Diego Costa (born 1988) is a professional footballer.

Diego Costa may also refer to:

Diego Costa Silva (born 1979), Brazilian footballer
Diego Salgado Costa de Menezes (born 1982), Brazilian footballer
Diego Costa (footballer, born 1999), Brazilian footballer

See also
 Diogo Costa (born 1999), Portuguese footballer
 Diogo Costa (sailor) (born 1997), Portuguese sailor